

National team

National students team

3rd World University Futsal Championship in Málaga
Russian students' futsal team was represented by club UPI Yekaterinburg

Top League

Preliminary round

Group A

Group B

Championship group

Relegation group

National Cup

Preliminary round

Group 1-A

Group 1-B

Group 1-Final

Group 2-A

Group 2-B

Group 2-Final

Group 3-A

Group 3-B

Group 3-Final

Group 4-A

Group 4-B

Group 4-Final

Final round

Group A

Group B

Final four

Top League Cup

Quarterfinals

Semifinal

Finals

First League

Final stage

First stage

First group
 Minkas Moscow
 MKZ Torpedo Moscow
 Minkas Moscow
 Novorus Moscow
 Sargon Moscow
 Universitet Yakutsk
 Kristall Neryungri

Second group
 Orly Rossii Lyubertsy
 ASKO Shchyolkovo
 Kvark Nefto Protvino
 Galax Saint Petersburg
 Mars Saint Petersburg
 Monolit Yuzhno-Sakhalinsk
 Zarya-2 Novgorog

Third group
 Soyuz Nizhny Novgorod
 Рerspektiva SKIF Naberezhnye Chelny
 Tan Ehdikon Kazan
 Kosmos Kazan
 Avtomobilist Kogalym
 Fenix-2 Chelyabinsk
 Rostselmash Rostov-on-Don

Fourth group
 Neftyanik Pokachi
 UPI-2 Yekaterinburg
 Metallurg Serov
 Tornado Yekaterinburg
 Iskra Kamensk-Uralsky
 Torpedo Sosnovoborsk
 VIZ Yekaterinburg
 Luch Yekaterinburg
 Severnye Yastreby Nizhnyaya Tura

First League Cup

Women's League
1st Russian women futsal championship 1992/1993

Preliminary round

First group

Second group

Third group
1.  Malahit Yekaterinburg  (Qualification to 5-8 places tournament)

Final round

1-4th places

5-8th places

References

Russia
Seasons in Russian futsal
futsal
futsal